Chantel Marie "Channy" Woodhead (born 17 September 1974 in Leeds, England) is a former English international football player. She played as a left back for clubs including Doncaster Belles and Everton Ladies. Woodhead won a single cap for the senior England team.

Club career

Woodhead played for Doncaster Belles while working in the mail order department of Leeds United. Following a spell at Everton, she signed for hometown club Leeds United Ladies in summer 2002.

International career
On 26 January 1995, Woodhead played the first half of England's 1–1 friendly draw against Italy in Florence. She was substituted off for Hope Powell at half–time. On the day of the match Woodhead had been admonished by the England management for wearing non–regulation trousers.

Woodhead was overlooked for the 1995 FIFA Women's World Cup squad by manager Ted Copeland. It was suggested to Woodhead that the dress code breach was reflective of her attitude: "So it looks like I've been dropped for wearing the wrong trousers. And what can you say to that? But it doesn't make you feel like going again, does it?"

References

1974 births
Living people
English women's footballers
Everton F.C. (women) players
Doncaster Rovers Belles L.F.C. players
Leeds United Women F.C. players
England women's international footballers
FA Women's National League players
Women's association football fullbacks
Bronte L.F.C. players